Charles Chaly Joseph vanden Wouwer or van den Wouwer (7 September 1916 - 1 June 1989) was a Belgian footballer who was born in Teignmouth (England).

Biography 
He played at inside right for Beerschot in the 1930s and 1940s, winning the Belgian Championship twice, in 1938 and 1939. He played 263 matches and scored 57 goals in the league.

A member of the Diables Rouges from 1938 to 1940, he played 8 games, including the last 16 of the 1938 World Cup.

Honours 
 International from 1938 to 1940 (8 caps and 2 goals)
 First international : France-Belgium 5–3, 30 January 1938 (scored 1 goal)
 Participation in the 1938 World Cup (played one match)
 Champion of Belgium in 1938 and 1939 with R Beerschot AC
 Vice-Champion of Belgium in 1937 with R Beerschot AC

References

External links 
 
 

Belgium international footballers
Belgian footballers
1938 FIFA World Cup players
K. Beerschot V.A.C. players
1916 births
1989 deaths
Association football midfielders